Events from the year 1221 in Ireland.

Incumbent
 Lord: Henry III

Births

Deaths
 Maelruanaidh Ó Dubhda, King of Uí Fiachrach Muaidhe